George Pennicott also known as Richard George Pennicott (29 September 1897 – 8 September 1966) was an Australian rules footballer who played with St Kilda in the Victorian Football League (VFL).

Height and Weight 

Richard George Pennicott's height and weight are 192 cm and 96 kg respectively.

References

External links 

1897 births
1966 deaths
Australian rules footballers from Tasmania
St Kilda Football Club players
Tatura Football Club players